Miguel Eduardo Miranda Campos (13 August 1966 – 6 March 2021) was a Peruvian football player and coach.

Club career
Miranda played club football as a goalkeeper for Sporting Cristal, Universidad Técnica de Cajamarca, Universitario, Juan Aurich, Deportivo Municipal, Deportivo Wanka, Coronel Bolognesi and Estudiantes de Medicina in Peru and Shenyang Haishi in China.

International career
He obtained 47 international caps for the Peru national team. He made his debut on 26 May 1993 in a 0–0 draw against the United States, and played his last international match for his native country on 14 November 2001, in a 1–1 draw against Bolivia.

Later life 
After retiring from football, Miguel joined soccer team coach in Peru.

He died on 6 March 2021 at the age of 54.

References

External links
 
 

1966 births
2021 deaths
Footballers from Lima
Peruvian footballers
Association football goalkeepers
Peru international footballers
1993 Copa América players
1995 Copa América players
1997 Copa América players
1999 Copa América players
Sporting Cristal footballers
Universidad Técnica de Cajamarca footballers
Club Universitario de Deportes footballers
Deportivo Sipesa footballers
Deportivo Pesquero footballers
Juan Aurich footballers
Deportivo Municipal footballers
Changsha Ginde players
Club Deportivo Wanka footballers
Coronel Bolognesi footballers
Estudiantes de Medicina footballers
Peruvian Primera División players
Peruvian expatriate footballers
Peruvian expatriate sportspeople in China
Expatriate footballers in China
Alianza Atlético managers